Freeling is a small town in South Australia, about 60 km north of Adelaide. It neighbours the Barossa Valley wine region. At the 2016 census, Freeling had a population of 2,214.

Description
Freeling is in the Light Regional Council, the state electoral district of Schubert and the federal Division of Barker.

History 
The township of Freeling was surveyed in March 1860 by Robert Stephenson.  It was named after Major-General Sir Arthur Henry Freeling, Surveyor-General of South Australia from 1849 to 1861. Freeling was a stopping place on the Gawler to Kapunda railway, which opened in 1860 but is no longer used. The Freeling Hotel was founded in 1863, the Railway Hotel in 1867 and the St Petri Lutheran Church (now a private home) in 1871.  By 1866, Freeling's population numbered approximately 60.

Local economy
The main source of income for the town is its extensive farming land, where mainly cereal crops are grown. It is regarded as some of the best farming land in Australia, with the University of Adelaide's Roseworthy Campus, (Roseworthy, South Australia) situated nearby. The long-term rainfall average for Freeling is 475mm/Yr, this enables wheat crops of up to 5-6T/Ha to be grown as well as large tonnages of cereal hay, with thousands of acres of hay being harvested each year. A factory making farming implement blades and parts, has also been situated at Freeling for many years.

A major tourist attraction for the town and surrounding area is a popular Australian Drama television series, McLeod's Daughters. The town had many sets used on the show, including the Gungellan Hotel (previously the Railway Hotel), truckstop and showgrounds.

Gallery

References

External links 

 Light Regional Council page on Freeling

Further reading 
 Kuhlmann, Thelma & Bockmann, Owen. Horses, Harrows and Haystacks: Freeling Through the Years 1860-1980. Adelaide: Freeling Women's Agricultural Bureau, 1981. 

Towns in South Australia